Re Kayley Vending Ltd [2009] EWHC 904 (Ch) is a UK insolvency law case concerning the pre-packaged administration procedure when a company is unable to repay its debts.

Facts
Kayley Vending Ltd’s directors faced a winding up petition from HMRC because it had not yet paid £79,000 in taxes on its business of running cigarette machine vending machines in pubs. The directors applied to court for an administration order under IA 1986, Sch B1, para 12(1)(b). It planned a pre-packaged administration, which had been negotiated with the insolvency practitioners and the company’s competitors, who were likely to buy the business for the most. (HMRC’s petition precluded an out of court appointment under IA 1986, Sch B1, paras 25 and 22.) They contended the vending machines in pubs could not be sold off where they were, so the business would be worth far less if the company went into liquidation.

Judgment
HH Judge Cooke held administration had a reasonable prospect of achieving a better return, and granted approval. Applicants for a prepack administration should provide sufficient information for a court to see that a prepack deal is not being used to disadvantage creditors. Furthermore, a proposed administrator’s costs may be counted as an expense of liquidation under para 13, and so it was here where the costs were incurred for the good of the creditors as a whole. It would not be so if a prepack sale was to the management, rather than an arm’s length purchaser. In the course of his judgment he discussed the concerns about pre-pack administrations.

See also

UK insolvency law

Notes

References
L Sealy and S Worthington, Cases and Materials in Company Law (9th edn OUP 2010)
R Goode, Principles of Corporate Insolvency Law (4th edn Sweet & Maxwell 2011)

United Kingdom insolvency case law